Rob McLaren (born March 7, 1948) is a retired Canadian football player who played for the Edmonton Eskimos, Winnipeg Blue Bombers, Hamilton Tiger-Cats and BC Lions of the Canadian Football League (CFL). He played college football at Simon Fraser University.

References

1948 births
Living people
BC Lions players
Canadian football linebackers
Edmonton Elks players
Hamilton Tiger-Cats players
Players of Canadian football from British Columbia
Simon Fraser Clan football players
Canadian football people from Vancouver
Winnipeg Blue Bombers players